Shivangi Verma (born 24 August) is an Indian actress and entertainer. She has majorly appeared in Hindi soap operas and Television commercials . She is known for playing the role of Meher in television show Hamari Sister Didi aired on Sony Pal and also for playing the role of Maya in TV, Biwi aur Main on Sab TV.

Personal life
Shivangi Verma was born on 24 August in New Delhi. She has completed her schooling from  Ryan International school, Vasant Kunj, New Delhi. She was fond of acting since childhood.

Filmography

Television

References

External links
 

Living people
1994 births
Actresses from New Delhi
Indian film actresses
Indian television actresses
Indian soap opera actresses
Actresses in Hindi television
21st-century Indian actresses